Jalen Ross Riley (born March 6, 1993) is an American professional basketball player for PAOK Thessaloniki of the Greek Basket League.

Riley attended Jerome I. Case High School in Mount Pleasant, Wisconsin. As a senior, he averaged 13.3 points per game and was named to the second-team All-Racine County. Riley walked on to the basketball team at the College of Lake County and averaged 15.9 points per game as a freshman. He earned a scholarship to Sauk Valley Community College as a sophomore, averaging 19.3 points and 3.4 rebounds per game. Riley transferred to East Tennessee State and was named Atlantic Sun Conference Newcomer of the Year as a junior. As a senior, he averaged 20.2 points per game and was named to the First Team All-Atlantic Sun.

Riley was cut by the Iowa Energy in training camp and had several brief stints with European clubs. In 2016, he signed with Akureyri in Iceland and averaged 18.2 points per game. In the 2018-19 season, he played for Palangos Kuršiai and averaged 26.3 points per game. He had a 50-point game on January 1, 2019. He played for Cholet Basket during the 2019-20 season and averaged 11.2 points per game before the season was suspended due to the COVID-19 pandemic. Riley signed with FC Porto of the Portuguese league on December 26, 2020. He averaged 16 points and 2.7 assist per game. 

On July 20, 2021, Riley signed with VEF Riga. On July 28, 2022, Riley moved to Greek club PAOK.

References

External links
East Tennessee State Buccaneers bio

1993 births
Living people
American men's basketball players
American expatriate basketball people in France
American expatriate basketball people in Greece
American expatriate basketball people in Iceland
American expatriate basketball people in Lithuania
American expatriate basketball people in Portugal
American expatriate basketball people in Slovakia
American expatriate basketball people in Spain
Basketball players from Wisconsin
BK VEF Rīga players
East Tennessee State Buccaneers men's basketball players
FC Porto basketball players
Junior college men's basketball players in the United States
P.A.O.K. BC players
Sportspeople from Racine, Wisconsin